Murzino (Mırźa) is a rural locality (a village) in Razdolyevsky Selsoviet, Krasnokamsky District, Bashkortostan, Russia. The population was 46 as of 2010. There are 6 streets.

Geography 
Murzino is located 19 km northeast of Nikolo-Beryozovka (the district's administrative centre) by road. Muzyak is the nearest rural locality.

References 

Rural localities in Krasnokamsky District